The Miss Massachusetts competition is a scholarship pageant put on annually by the Miss Massachusetts Scholarship Foundation, Inc. The winner of the pageant receives the title of Miss Massachusetts and represents the state of Massachusetts at the  Miss America pageant in Atlantic City, New Jersey.

Women between the ages of 17 and 24 who meet residency, scholastic and character requirements are eligible to compete in local pageants, the winners of which continue on to the Miss Massachusetts pageant in Worcester each July.

Contestants at the Miss Massachusetts competition are judged in five areas: personal interview, poise and grace in evening gown, lifestyle and fitness in swimsuit, artistic expression, and on stage question. Scholarships are awarded for Miss Massachusetts, first through fourth runners-up, preliminary talent winners, preliminary swimsuit winners, non-finalist talent winner, MAO Academic Award, MAO Service Award, and MAO Children's Miracle Network Award.

Katrina Kincade of Boston was crowned Miss Massachusetts 2022 on July 3, 2022, at Hanover Theatre in Worcester, Massachusetts. She competed for the title of Miss America 2023 at the Mohegan Sun in Uncasville, Connecticut in December 2022.

Results summary 
The following is a visual summary of the past results of Miss Massachusetts titleholders at the national Miss America pageants/competitions. The year in parentheses indicates the year of the national competition during which a placement and/or award was garnered, not the year attached to the contestant's state title.

Placements 
 1st runners-up: Paulina McKevitt* (1944), Catherine Monroe (1969), Abbie Rabine (2002)
 2nd runners-up: Helena Frances Mack* (1943), Deborah O'Brien (1972), Elizabeth Pierre (2022)
 3rd runners-up: Polly Connors (1940)
 4th runners-up: Lauren Kuhn (2015), Gabriela Taveras (2019)
 Top 10: Virginia Maffucci (1956), Jewel Smerage (1957), Brenda Crovo (1961), Carol Kennedy (1967), Georgina Hossfeld (1970), Cynthia Carpenter (1976), Margaret O'Brien (1985), Lisa Desroches (1993), Marcia Turner (1996), Melanie Correia (2003)
 Top 15: Martha E. Hick** (1927), Ethel Beatrice Pierce* (1927), Barbara Laughton (1948), Alissa Musto (2017)
 Top 16: Claire Nevulis* (1937)
 Top 18: Elsie Taylor (1933)

Awards

Preliminary awards
 Preliminary Lifestyle and Fitness: Helena Frances Mack* (1943), Abbie Rabine (2002)
 Preliminary On Stage Interview: Gabriela Taveras (2019)
 Preliminary Talent: Claire Nevulis (1937), Helena Frances Mack* (1943), Virginia Maffucci (1956), Cynthia Carpenter (1976), Margaret O'Brien (1985), Erika Ebbel (2005), Valerie Amaral (2008)
 Preliminary Interview: Abbie Rabine (2002)

Non-finalist awards
 Non-finalist Talent: Sharon Faught (1960), Maria Lynn Chaffee (1968), Marie Semas (1973), Rena Walmsley (1974), Amy Linder (1981), Holly Mayer (1984), Lisa Kleypas (1986), Aurelie McCarthy (1988), Marissa Laakso (1991), Melissa Bloemker (1992), Sharon Lee (1995), Lori Flick (1997), April Thibeaut (2000), Erika Ebbel (2005), Valerie Amaral (2008), Taylor Kinzler (2013)
 Non-finalist Interview: Elizabeth Hancock (1999)

Other awards
 Miss Congeniality: N/A
 Dr. David B. Allman Medical Scholarship: Susan Sadlier (1975)
 Charles & Theresa Brown Scholarship: Lauren Kuhn (2015), Alissa Musto (2017)
 Children's Miracle Network (CMN) Miracle Maker Award Winner: Valerie Amaral (2008), Loren Galler-Rabinowitz (2011)
 CMN Miracle Maker Award 2nd runners-up: Jillian Zucco (2018)
 People's Choice Award: Gabriela Taveras (2019)
 Quality of Life Award Finalists: Valerie Amaral (2008)
 STEM Scholarship Award Winners: Lauren Kuhn (2015), Jillian Zucco (2018), Gabriela Taveras (2019)
 STEM Scholarship Award 1st runners-up: Lyndsey Littlefield (2020)
 Waterford Crystal Award for Business Marketing and Management: Samira Zebian (1998)

Winners

References

External links
 Miss Massachusetts official website
 Miss Massachusetts page on Miss America official website

Massachusetts culture
Massachusetts
Women in Massachusetts
Recurring events established in 1922
1922 establishments in Massachusetts
Annual events in Massachusetts